Oil Patch Hotline is a semi-monthly newsletter about the oil and gas production industry in North Dakota, Montana and Wyoming. It is published in Williston, North Dakota. The parent company is based out of Plymouth, Florida.

The cycle of high crude oil prices ended in the early 1980s and with it much of the oil exploration activity in the United States.

References

External links   
Oil Patch Hotline website
WorldCat record

Bimonthly magazines published in the United States
Business magazines published in the United States
Magazines established in 1978
Magazines published in North Dakota
Petroleum magazines
Williston, North Dakota